Suhaimi Yusof (born 4 September 1969) is a Singaporean actor, comedian, entertainer and radio DJ, known for playing exaggerated Malay stereotype characters and for his spontaneity. Along with Batrisyia Johari who he plays with her heart.

Life and career

Early life
Suhaimi was born on 4 September 1969, in Jalan Kampung Tengah, Punggol, Singapore, the seventh of nine children. Suhaimi's mother, Fatimah Yusof (née Adenan, born 1940), was a homemaker and his father, Yusof Bujang, was a technician. The family moved to Hougang when Suhaimi was sixteen. Suhaimi was initially shy by nature, but soon realised his potential as an actor in secondary school, when his teacher selected him to perform a skit for a Teachers' Day concert. Initially panicking, he finally came up with a character named "Montfort Jackson," a spoof of American recording artist Michael Jackson and received many laughs from his peers during his performance.

Radio and television
At an inter-school Malay debate competition, Suhaimi greatly impressed Zakiah Halim, a Malay radio veteran, with his performance. Following that, Halim offered Suhaimi a part-time job as a host on the radio programme Majalah Remaja, which was aimed at teens. After his studies and the completion of his compulsory national service, Suhaimi joined the Singapore Broadcasting Corporation (SBC) (now Mediacorp) as a full-time radio presenter, and soon he was hosting the morning radio show. Thereafter, SBC's television department offered him his first onscreen gig, co-hosting Potret Keluarga, a weekly family programme. Shortly after, he received another hosting job, this time on Hiburan Minggu Ini, an entertainment programme. Suhaimi was offered the role of maintenance guy Sulaiman Yusof in the sitcom Living with Lydia, starring alongside Hong Kong comedian Lydia Shum Din-Ha. He accepted the job, and his character proved a hit with viewers of the sitcom. It would be Suhaimi's first role in English television.

In 2001, Suhaimi quit radio to focus more on television. At that point, he had already become an assistant programme director on Malay radio station Warna 94.2FM. He has acted in many Mediacorp Channel 5 sitcoms, notably as Sgt Dollah Abu Bakar in Police & Thief and "mat rock" reporter Jojo Joget in The Noose.

In early 2012, Suhaimi made a controversial move by writing an open letter on his Facebook Wall criticising Mediacorp Suria for not showing enough appreciation for local talents, and called on other Malay Singaporean actors to seek a better future in Malaysia instead. This caused a stir on the local Malay entertainment scene. Suhaimi later explained that it was "constructive criticism" and it "wasn't a personal attack on anyone in Suria".

Suhaimi is currently directing and producing an untitled 15-episode comedy series for Astro and has also landed his first role on the big screen as a murder suspect in the upcoming Malay suspense film Psycho.

Businessman
Suhaimi and his wife run an events management and production house called Q & Que, where Suhaimi is creative director. Suhaimi also produces VCDs and DVDs of his comedy performances distributed by Life Records. The first product, entitled Keramat Bernisan, was a live recording and was released in 2004. 25,000 copies were sold in Singapore within three weeks. Subsequently, he produced a series of successful Comedy DVD series, most notably the "Takleh Angkat" series that became an iconic comedy favourite for the local Malay Community as well as abroad . More than 150,000 official copies of Suhaimi's VCDs and DVDs have been sold.

Other appearances
As part of the MTL Fortnight, initiated by the Singapore Ministry of Education, Suhaimi was invited by the Malay Department of Pei Tong Primary School to give a motivational talk for parents on how to motivate their children.

Education
Suhaimi spent four years at Montfort Secondary School. After obtaining his 'O' levels, he attended Tampines Junior College and graduated with a Bachelor of Arts Degree in Broadcast Media Production with First Class Honours from Teesside University, UK.

Influences
Suhaimi's comedy is rooted in stand-up. He counts American comedians such as Bill Cosby, Robin Williams, Will Smith and David Letterman as influences.

Personal life
Suhaimi is married to Siti Yuhana Sulaiman (born 1969) and they have three children namely Sufi (born 1999), Nurjannah (born 1997) and Amirul (born 1995).

Honours and awards
Since 2001, Suhaimi received four trophies for The Most Popular Personality Award, four trophies for The Best Host Awards, a trophy for The Best Actor in a Comedic Role Award and a trophy for The Best TV Opening Graphic Award as an Editor in The Singapore Mediacorp Malay TV Award Event, Pesta Perdana.

Suhaimi received the Best Comedy Performance award by an Actor at the 2011 Asian Television Awards for his efforts in The Noose.

He took fourth position in the reality comedy television series Maharaja Lawak Mega.

Filmography
Television Telemovie Drama

Film

Shows Hosted

References

External links
 

1969 births
Living people
Singaporean radio presenters
21st-century Singaporean male actors
Singaporean male film actors
Singaporean male television actors
Singaporean people of Malay descent
Singaporean Muslims